M-217, also known as Michiana Parkway, is a multi-lane state trunkline highway in the U.S. state of Michigan. The Michiana Parkway, which extends into Indiana, was constructed as a joint effort of the Michigan Department of Transportation (MDOT), the Cass County Road Commission and the Elkhart County Highway Department.

Route description
M-217 starts at State Line Road on the Michigan–Indiana state line. It is the continuation of CR 17 that runs due north to an intersection with US Highway 12 (US 12) in Porter Township in Cass County. The highway crosses farmland between the two termini. In 2008, 4,239 vehicles used the highway on a daily basis in MDOT's average annual daily traffic (AADT) survey. The survey calculated how many vehicles used the roadway on average each day. The 2008 counts also showed that 75 trucks were included in the total. For 2009, the figured dropped to 3,738 vehicles and 67 trucks. M-217 is not listed on the National Highway System, a system of highways important to the country's economy, defense, and mobility.

History
The Michiana Parkway was constructed from CR 4, just south of the "Elkhart East" interchange (exit 96) of the Indiana Toll Road, to US 12 in Porter Township, along the boundary with Mason Township. The Indiana portion was an upgrade and extension of Elkhart County Road 17 to the state line; Michigan's portion was entirely new construction built by the Michigan Department of Transportation and numbered M-217. With the completion of M-217, MDOT and the Cass County Road Commission swapped roads on September 25, 2002. MDOT took over jurisdiction of M-217 and gave M-205 to the road commission, an action that decommissioned M-205 as a state trunkline.

Major intersections

See also

References

External links

M-217 at Michigan Highways

217
M217